Southerner can refer to:

 A person from the southern part of a state or country; for example:
 Lhotshampas, also called Southerners, ethnically Nepalese residents of southern Bhutan
 Someone from South India
 Someone form Southern England
 Someone from the Southern United States
 Black Southerners, African-American people from the Southern United States who identify as such
 White Southerners, European-American people from the Southern United States who identify as such

Organisations 
 Southerners (Korean political faction) of the Joseon Period in Korea, resulting from a split in 1590 of the Easterners (Korean political faction)
 Southerners Sports Club (Bangkok), an informal, non-commercial Bangkok-based club of expats and Thais
 Sureños (Spanish for "Southerners"), a group of Mexican-American street gangs in the United States

Creative works 
 The Southerner (1913), a novel about Abraham Lincoln by Thomas Dixon Jr.
 The Southerner (film), by Jean Renoir
 The Southerner (high school newspaper), from Atlanta, Georgia
 "Southerners", a song by Prefuse 73 from the 2003 album One Word Extinguisher

Vehicles 

 Southerner (U.S. train), a United States passenger train operated by the Southern Railway, between New York and New Orleans
 Southerner, a United States passenger train operated by the Missouri Pacific railway, between St. Louis and different Texas termini (Laredo and Galveston)
 USS Southerner (1861), a schooner used as a sunken obstruction in the American Civil War
 Southerner (marine vessel), an outside broadcast unit
 Southerner (New Zealand train), a former New Zealand express passenger train

See also 
 Northerner (disambiguation)
 Southern Man (disambiguation)